Farm to Market Roads in Texas are owned and maintained by the Texas Department of Transportation (TxDOT).

FM 1100

FM 1100 begins at an intersection with US 290, between Manor and Elgin. It proceeds north  and then east  into Elgin, where it crosses SH 95 before terminating at Loop 109. Within Elgin, FM 1100 is named Main Street.

FM 1100 was reassigned to the current alignment between US 290 and SH 95. A segment of Loop 109 was transferred on October 19, 1990.

Junction list

FM 1100 (1948)

The highway was extended  to a road intersection west of Somerset on December 18, 1951. FM 1100 was cancelled on May 25, 1953, with the mileage being transferred to FM 476.

FM 1101

Farm to Market Road 1101 (FM 1101) is located in Comal and Guadalupe counties. The highway runs closely parallel to I-35 between SH 46 and Kohlenberg Road in New Braunfels.

FM 1101 begins at an intersection with SH 46 in New Braunfels. The highway travels along Freiheit Road and intersects FM 306 near a major retail center before leaving the city. After leaving New Braunfels, FM 1101 travels through more rural areas before ending at an intersection with SH 123 near Zorn.

Junction list

FM 1102

Farm to Market Road 1102 (FM 1102) is located in Comal County.

FM 1102 begins at an intersection with FM 306 in New Braunfels near Gruene. The highway travels in a generally northeast direction until an intersection with FM 2439. FM 1102 turns in a southern direction at the intersection and continues to travel in a generally southeast direction until ending at I-35 between San Marcos and New Braunfels.

The highway was extended  southwestward of Hunter on September 15, 1949, absorbing FM 1338 in the process. FM 1102 was extended  to FM 306 on April 30, 1987.

Junction list

FM 1103

Farm to Market Road 1103 (FM 1103) is located in Comal and Guadalupe counties. Its southern terminus is in Cibolo, at FM 78. The route travels to the northeast and then doglegs to the northwest before entering Schertz and reaching its northern terminus at I-35 exit 178. The roadway continues as Hubertus Road, which provides access to FM 482.

FM 1103 was designated on December 16, 1948. The routing has remained unchanged except for a redesignation of the southern terminus on November 25, 1975, due to the realignment of FM 78 in Cibolo.

FM 1104

Farm to Market Road 1104 (FM 1104) is located in Guadalupe County.

FM 1104 begins at an intersection with FM 1150 southeast of Kingsbury. The highway has a junction with I-10 and enters the town. FM 1104 travels through the town in a northwest direction before ending at an intersection with US 90 east of the town square.

The highway was extended  to US 90 on January 29, 1949. The section of FM 1104 between the Darst Oil Field and SH 80 was transferred to FM 1150 on March 22, 1949.

Junction list

FM 1105

Farm to Market Road 1105 (FM 1105) is located in Williamson County.

FM 1105 begins at an intersection with FM 971 in Weir. The highway travels in a mostly northeastern and northwestern direction and has an overlap with FM 972 near the town of Walburg. FM 1105 travels in a slight northwestern direction after the overlap and runs through the communities of Theon and New Corn Hill before ending at an intersection with FM 487 in Schwertner.

The highway was extended  along FM 972 and southward to FM 2606 (now FM 971) at Weir on September 20, 1961.

Junction list

FM 1105 (1948)

The highway was extended  to the Bexar county line on May 23, 1951. FM 1105 was extended  into Bexar County to a road intersection on November 20, 1951. FM 1105 was cancelled on January 29, 1953, with the mileage being transferred to FM 471.

FM 1106

Farm to Market Road 1106 (FM 1106) is located in Montague County.

FM 1106 is a two-lane route for its entire length. Its western terminus is northeast of Nocona at FM 3428, which provides access to FM 2634. The short route travels east and then north near the western side of Lake Nocona before state maintenance ends just north of Ash Street.

The current FM 1106 was designated on October 21, 1981, along the current route.

FM 1106 (1948)

The first FM 1106 was designated on December 16, 1948, from US 87 in LaVernia to the Guadalupe County line; this route was cancelled and made a part of FM 775 in 1949.

FM 1106 (1951)

The route number was subsequently used beginning on May 23, 1951, on a short route from FM 63 (now SH 72) near Tilden southward  in McMullen County; this route was transferred to FM 99 on March 27, 1981, due to the construction of Choke Canyon Reservoir, which submerged part of the old route of FM 99 (the southernmost 5.5 miles of the old route of FM 99 were previously designated as FM 2153).

FM 1107

Farm to Market Road 1107 (FM 1107) is located in Wilson County. The highway runs from Bus. US 87 in Stockdale to US 87 in Pandora.

FM 1107 was designated on December 16, 1948, running from US 87 (now Bus. The highway was extended  northeastward and southeastward to US 87 in Pandora on December 17, 1952.

Junction list

RM 1108

Ranch to Market Road 1108 (RM 1108) is located in Culberson County. Its southern terminus is at a pipeline booster station. The route travels east and then north before ending at RM 652.

RM 1108 was established on December 16, 1948, as Farm to Market Road 1108 (FM 1108), a  road from US 62 at the New Mexico state line south to "the pipeline booster stations." On October 27, 1959, the route was redesignated RM 1108. On April 29, 1975, the northern  of the highway were reassigned to RM 652.

FM 1109

Farm to Market Road 1109 (FM 1109) was located in El Paso County. No highway currently uses the FM 1109 designation.

FM 1109 was designated in 1948, running from US 80 (now SH 20) northwest of Tornillo southwestward to the Rio Grande River. The highway was to be cancelled on June 30, 2005, but was not to be cancelled until construction of the new FM 3539 had started. FM 1109 was not cancelled until May 27, 2010, with maintenance being handed over to the county.

FM 1110

Farm to Market Road 1110 (FM 1110) is located in El Paso County.

FM 1110 begins at an intersection with FM 258 in San Elizario. The highway travels east along San Elizario Road and enters Clint just before an intersection with SH 20. FM 1110 travels in a slight northeast direction through the town and turns north at Fenter Road and travels along Clint Cut-Off Road before intersecting FM 76. The two highways have an overlap together before FM 1110 turns off onto Clint-San Elizario Road. FM 1110 travels in a northeast direction before ending at I-10.

The highway was extended along FM 76 and to I-10 on May 25, 1976. On June 27, 1995, the section between FM 258 and FM 76 was redesignated Urban Road 1110 (UR 1110). The designation of this section reverted to FM 1110 with the elimination of the Urban Road system on November 15, 2018.

Junction list

RM 1111

Ranch to Market Road 1111 (RM 1111) is located in Hudspeth County.

From here, the route runs north through Sierra Blanca, intersecting I-10 at exit 107. RM 1111 turns east and then north before ending at US 62/US 180 east of Cornudas.

On May 23, 1951, this was extended a further  to US 62. On December 6, 1957, FM 1111 became RM 1111 and the section south of present-day I-10 Business was added, replacing RM 2528.

Junction list

FM 1112

Farm to Market Road 1112 (FM 1112) is located in Presidio County.

The route travels east on E. Oak Street before turning north on Golf Course Road and ending at the Marfa Municipal Golf Course.

FM 1112 was designated on December 16, 1948, between Marfa and the original Marfa Airport.

FM 1113

Farm to Market Road 1113 (FM 1113) is located in Coryell County.

FM 1113 begins at an intersection with FM 580 in the community of Topsey. The highway travels in a generally southern direction and turns in a slight southeast direction near County Road 31. FM 1113 enters Copperas Cove and travels along Avenue B, passing by several subdivisions before intersecting FM 116 near the town square. The two highways travel along 1st Street before turning onto Avenue D. FM 1113 travels along Avenue D with FM 116 before ending at an intersection with Bus. US 190.

FM 1113 was designated on December 16, 1948, running from FM 116 to US 190 (now Bus. The highway was extended  to Topsey on May 23, 1951. On June 27, 1995, the section between FM 116 and US 190 was redesignated Urban Road 1113 (UR 1113). The designation of this section reverted to FM 1113 with the elimination of the Urban Road system on November 15, 2018.

Junction list

FM 1114

Farm to Market Road 1114 (FM 1114) is a short two-lane highway located in Coryell County.

FM 1114 begins at an intersection with County Road 356 in The Grove and travels in a northern direction before ending at an intersection with SH 36 / SH 236.

FM 1114 was designated on December 16, 1948, along the current route.

FM 1115

Farm to Market Road 1115 (FM 1115) is located in Fayette and Gonzales counties.

FM 1115 begins at an intersection with US 90 / SH 97 in Waelder. The highway travels through town along Avenue E and intersects FM 1296 before leaving the city limits. FM 1115 travels in a slight northeast direction and turns east near the Gonzales–Fayette county line before turning north at an intersection with FM 2762. The highway continues to run in a mostly northern direction before ending at an intersection with SH 95 near Cistern.

The highway was extended  to SH 95 on July 28, 1955.

Junction list

FM 1116

Farm to Market Road 1116 (FM 1116) is located in Gonzales County.

FM 1116 begins at an intersection with US 87 between Smiley and Westhoff. The highway travels in a predominately northeast direction through mostly rural farmland. FM 1116 travels through the town of Pilgrim and ends at an intersection with SH 97 south of Gonzales.

The highway was extended  on May 23, 1951. FM 1116 was extended  southward on September 29, 1954. The highway was extended  to US 87 on October 31, 1958.

FM 1117

Farm to Market Road 1117 (FM 1117) is located in Gonzales and Guadalupe counties. The highway connects rural farm area West Capote–Leesville with the towns of Nixon and Seguin. The section of FM 1117 in Guadalupe County is known as Raymond Stotzer Highway.

FM 1117 begins at an intersection with SH 80 / SH 97 in Sandies–Leesville, 2 miles north of Nixon city limits. The highway travels in a northwest direction through West Capote–Leesville, including developed areas in Guadalupe County in the Zion Hill area. FM 1117 intersects with West Capote’s FM 466 southeast of Seguin and crosses the Guadalupe River. The highway ends at an intersection with Alt. US 90 east of Seguin near the Randolph Air Force Base Auxiliary Airport.

The highway was extended  to the Guadalupe County line on June 2, 1967, and to FM 466 on June 15, 1967, absorbing  of FM 2770 in the process. FM 1117 was extended  to Alt. US 90 on November 19, 1979.

Junction list

FM 1118

Farm to Market Road 1118 (FM 1118) is located in Kleberg County.

FM 1118 was designated on December 16, 1948, from US 77 at Ricardo east . On June 2, 1967, the route was extended east and south to its current eastern terminus at FM 772.

FM 1119

Farm to Market Road 1119 (FM 1119) is located in Leon and Madison counties.

FM 1119 begins at an intersection with SH OSR northwest of Midway. The highway travels in a northwestern direction through land that alternates between farm land and heavily forested areas. FM 1119 enters into Centerville and travels along Cass Street before ending at an intersection with SH 7 one block east of SH 75.

The highway was extended  southeastward to Middleton on May 23, 1951. FM 1119 was extended  to the old FM 2036 on May 2, 1962, and on to SH OSR on May 25, 1962, replacing  of the old FM 2036.

Junction list

FM 1120

Farm to Market Road 1120 (FM 1120) is located in Real County.

FM 1120 begins at an intersection with U.S. Highway 83 (US 83) just south of Leakey. The  road travels east to the community of Rio Frio where it intersects RM 2748 where it heads north to terminate at an intersection with US 83.

FM 1120 travels along the Frio River until it heads west towards US 83.

FM 1120 was designated on December 16, 1948, from US 83 south of Leakey southeast . On May 3, 1949, another section was created from Rio Frio to US 83, replacing FM 1121. This created a gap in the route. On July 15, 1949, this gap was closed.

Junction list

FM 1121

Farm to Market Road 1121 (FM 1121) is located in McCulloch County.

FM 1121 begins at an intersection with US 283 northwest of Brady. The highway travels in an eastern direction and intersects FM 2996 before having a short overlap with US 377. FM 1121 travels in a northeast direction along the overlap before returning to an eastern direction. The highway continues to run in an eastern direction before ending at an intersection with US 190 in Rochelle.

The highway was extended  to US 283 on October 31, 1958, creating an overlap with US 377 in the process.

Junction list

FM 1121 (1948)

The highway was cancelled on May 3, 1949, with the mileage being transferred to FM 1120.

FM 1122

Farm to Market Road 1122 (FM 1122) is located in Hardin County. Its western terminus is at FM 418 near the community of Reeves.

FM 1122 was designated on May 23, 1951, along the current route.

FM 1122 (1948)

A previous route numbered FM 1122 was designated in Brown County on November 23, 1948, running approximately  southward from US 67/US 84 in Bangs to FM 586. This route was combined with FM 586 on June 16, 1949.

FM 1123

Farm to Market Road 1123 (FM 1123) is located in Bell County.

FM 1123 begins at an intersection with SH 95 in Holland concurrent with FM 2268. The two highways travel in a slight northwest direction along Travis Street before turning northeast onto Lexington Street. FM 2268 leaves the overlap at Josephine Street while FM 1123 continues to run along Lexington Street. The highway turns to the northwest at Roberts Road and runs in a slight northwest direction before turning back towards the north at Barnes Road. FM 1123 crosses the Salado Creek and passes near several resorts near the creek. The highway turns in a western direction and crosses the Lampasas River before turning back north. FM 1123 ends at an intersection with FM 436 southeast of Belton.

FM 1123 was designated on January 27, 1949, along the current route.

Junction list

FM 1124

Farm to Market Road 1124 (FM 1124) is located in Freestone County.

FM 1124 begins at an intersection with FM 488 northeast of Fairfield and travels in a southeastern direction before ending at an intersection with County Road 210.

The highway was extended  northwestward to FM 488 on June 28, 1963. Approximately  of FM 1124 between Young and FM 2570 was removed from the state highway system, while  of the highway was transferred to FM 2570 on January 23, 1984.

FM 1125

FM 1126

Farm to Market Road 1126 (FM 1126) is located in Navarro County.

FM 1126 begins at an intersection with SH 31 southwest of Corsicana. The highway travels in a northwest direction and has an overlap with FM 744 and intersects SH 22 in Barry. FM 1126 continues to run in a northwest direction and turns northeast at an intersection with FM 2930. The highway enters Emhouse and intersects FM 1839 and FM 3383 in the town. FM 1126 continues to run in a northeast direction before ending at I-45 / US 287 just south of Rice.

The highway was extended  southwestward to SH 31 on July 25, 1951, absorbing Spur 32 in the process. FM 1126 was extended  northeastward on October 31, 1958. FM 1126 was extended  northeastward to I-45 on November 24, 1959.

Junction list

FM 1127

Farm to Market Road 1127 (FM 1127) is located in San Jacinto County.

FM 1127 begins at an intersection with US 59 north of Shepherd. The highway travels in an eastern direction and turns northeast at Mussel Shoals and travels through the Drew's Landing community before turning back to the east. FM 1127 passes a subdivision before running parallel to the Trinity River before state maintenance ends with the road continuing as Watson Road.

The current FM 1127 was designated on May 23, 1951, along the current route.

Junction list

FM 1127 (1949)

The highway was cancelled and combined with FM 639 on October 26, 1949.

FM 1128

Farm to Market Road 1128 (FM 1128) is located in Brazoria County.

FM 1128 is a short urban road running between Manvel and Pearland. The southern terminus is at  SH 6 in Manvel. The route travels north along Masters Road; it crosses Bailey Road at the city limits of Pearland, in which it is known as Manvel Road. The FM 1128 designation ends at  FM 518.

The current route of FM 1128 was designated on May 23, 1951.

Junction list

FM 1128 (1949)

FM 1128 was originally designated on a route in Navarro County from SH 31 east of Powell to a mile south; this route was cancelled on May 26, 1949, in exchange for creation the section of FM 636 from FM 1129 to Montfort.

FM 1129

Farm to Market Road 1129 (FM 1129) is located in Navarro County.

FM 1129 begins at an intersection with SH 31 just west of Powell. The highway runs roughly parallel to I-45 for its entire length and ends at an intersection with FM 85 between Ennis and Seven Points.

A spur connection to Roane was created on April 28, 1950. FM 1129 was extended  to FM 85 on October 26, 1954. The section of highway between FM 85 and FM 662 was transferred to FM 85 on October 30, 1961. The spur connection to Roane was transferred to FM 3041 on May 19, 1966.

Junction list

FM 1130

FM 1131

FM 1132

FM 1133

FM 1133 (1949)

The original FM 1133 was designated on January 27, 1949, from Spur 171 (now FM 1006) north  to a county road. FM 1133 was cancelled on June 24, 1953, and eliminated from the highway system to allow funding for extension of US 90.

FM 1134

FM 1134 (1949)

The original FM 1134 was designated on January 27, 1949, from the then-proposed location of SH 87 (previously proposed as FM 407) north of Orange northeast  toward Echo. On November 21, 1955, the road was extended west to FM 1130. FM 1134 was cancelled on March 14, 1962, and mileage was transferred to relocated FM 1130 (FM 3247 replaced this section of FM 1130 on September 13, 1989), whole the old route of FM 1130 south to I-10 was given to the city of Orange because of construction of I-10.

FM 1134 (1964)

The second FM 1134 was designated on May 6, 1964, from US 77 in Italy to I-35E. FM 1134 was cancelled on August 18, 1987, and mileage was transferred to SH 34.

FM 1135

Farm to Market Road 1135 (FM 1135) is located in Orange County. It runs from US 90 in Vidor south to FM 105.

FM 1135 was designated on January 27, 1949, on the current route. It was cancelled on March 29, 1952, to allow funding for extension of US 90 but was reinstated on December 17, 1952.

FM 1136

FM 1137

FM 1137 (1949)

The original FM 1137 was designated on January 27, 1949, from SH 62 near Peveto northeast 3.2 miles to FM 1130. FM 1137 was cancelled on March 29, 1952, and eliminated from the highway system to allow funding for extension of US 90. The route was revived in 1953 and 1954 as part of FM 406 (this section was later renumbered FM 1078).

FM 1138

Farm to Market Road 1138 (FM 1138) is located in Rockwall and Collin counties.

FM 1138 begins at an intersection with SH 66 between Fate and Royse City. The highway travels in a northern direction to Nevada and has an overlap with FM 6 through the town. FM 1138 leaves the overlap and returns to traveling in a northern direction before ending at an intersection with FM 1778.

The highway was extended  to FM 6 and FM 1778 on September 26, 1953.

Junction list

FM 1139

Farm to Market Road 1139 (FM 1139) is located in Rockwall County. The highway connects FM 549 in southeastern Rockwall to FM 550 in McLendon-Chisholm.

FM 1139 was designated on January 27, 1949, along the current route.

FM 1140

Farm to Market Road 1140 (FM 1140) is located in Rockwall County in the town of Heath.

FM 1140 begins at an intersection with FM 740 (Laurence Drive) / Hubbard Drive near Towne Center Park. The highway travels in a northwest direction along Smirl Drive and turns northeast at Darr Road. FM 1140 travels near Lake Ray Hubbard and turns east at Mariah Bay Drive. Smirl Drive turns into Laurence Drive at Old Ridge Road before the highway ends at an intersection with FM 740 (Ridge Road / Laurence Drive) / Heathland Crossing.

The highway was designated on January 27, 1949, along the current route. On June 27, 1995, the entire route was redesignated Urban Road 1140 (UR 1140). The designation reverted to FM 1140 with the elimination of the Urban Road system on November 15, 2018.

FM 1141

FM 1142

FM 1142 (1949)

The original FM 1142 was designated on January 27, 1949, from FM 548 near Blackland southeast  to a county road. On July 15, 1949, the road extended southwest to SH 205. FM 1142 was cancelled on November 4, 1955, and mileage was transferred to rerouted FM 548, while the old route of FM 548 from what is now SH 276 to SH 205 was transferred to FM 1143 (now SH 276) and FM 550.

FM 1143

Farm to Market Road 1143 (FM 1143) is located in the city of Temple.

FM 1143 begins at a junction with I-35 in northern Temple. The highway travels in a slight southeastern direction along Industrial Boulevard before ending at an intersection with Spur 290.

The highway was extended  northwestward to Industrial Boulevard on September 2, 1971. On June 27, 1995, the entire route was redesignated Urban Road 1143 (UR 1143). The highway's western terminus was moved to the northbound frontage road of I-35 in 2014 as part of the My35 construction project. The designation reverted to FM 1143 with the elimination of the Urban Road system on November 15, 2018.

FM 1143 (1949)

The highway was extended eastward to the Rockwall–Hunt county line and westward to a county road on November 4, 1955, absorbing FM 1395, FM 2376, and parts of FM 548 and FM 551, with those two highways being re-routed. FM 1143 was extended westward from FM 549 to SH 205 on October 31, 1957. The highway was cancelled on November 26, 1969, and was replaced by SH 276.

FM 1144

FM 1145

FM 1146

FM 1147

FM 1148

 Originally RM 1148.

FM 1149

FM 1150

FM 1151

FM 1152

FM 1153

Farm to Market Road 1153 (FM 1153) is located in Baylor County.

On January 30, 1951, a  segment of the west–east section was cancelled in exchange for the creation of FM 1604 (now RM 1919).

FM 1154

FM 1154 (1949)

The original FM 1154 was designated on February 25, 1949, from SH 63 at Burkeville southeastward  to a road intersection. On July 15, 1949, the road was extended southeast  to another road intersection. On November 20, 1951, the road extended southeast . FM 1154 was cancelled on January 29, 1953, and mileage was transferred to FM 1414.

FM 1155

Farm to Market Road 1155 (FM 1155) is located in Washington County.

FM 1155 begins at an intersection with FM 1371 in Chappell Hill. The highway intersects US 290 and FM 2447 before leaving the town. North of Chappell Hill, FM 1155 runs in a mostly northern direction and runs through farmland with some rural subdivisions and turns east at FM 2193. The highway runs in an eastern direction and turns back north near an intersection with FM 2726 and turns northeast at FM 912. FM 1155 intersects FM 1370 before running through the town of Washington and turns northwest near Washington-on-the-Brazos State Historic Site. The highway continues to run in a northwest direction before ending at an intersection with SH 105.

FM 1155 was extended  eastward on August 24, 1954, when US 290 was relocated near Chappell Hill. The southern section of highway was renumbered as FM 2447 on November 21, 1956, and the remainder of FM 1155 was extended to FM 2193, absorbing part of that highway in the process. On March 5, 1963, part of FM 912 was transferred.

Junction list

FM 1156

FM 1157

FM 1158

FM 1159

FM 1160

FM 1161

FM 1162

FM 1163

FM 1164

Farm to Market Road 1164 (FM 1164) is located in Wharton County. The two-lane road runs south-southeast before making a 90-degree turn to the east-northeast at CR 254. It proceeds to East Bernard, where it reaches its eastern terminus at SH 60.

FM 1164 was designated on February 25, 1949, from US 90 Alternate southeastward . The former community of Nottawa was located at the junction with US 90 Alternate. FM 1164 was extended to SH 60 on November 20, 1951. On January 18, 1967, this extension was transferred to FM 2919, reverting FM 1164 to its 1951 description.

RM 1165

Ranch to Market Road 1165 (RM 1165) is located in Culberson County.

The route was designated as Farm to Market Road 1165 (FM 1165) on March 15, 1949, from FM 1108 eastward  to its current eastern terminus. On October 27, 1959, the designation was changed to RM 1165. On June 30, 1964, the western segment was transferred to RM 652.

FM 1166

FM 1167

FM 1168

FM 1169

FM 1170

Farm to Market Road 1170 (FM 1170) is located in Nolan County.

FM 1170 was designated on October 28, 1953, from SH 70 in Blackwell northeastward . On July 28, 1955, FM 1170 was extended northeast to FM 53 (now SH 153). On November 21, 1956, FM 1170 was extended northwest  from SH 70. On May 2, 1962, FM 1170 was extended northwest . On June 28, 1963, FM 1170 was extended north  to FM 2600. On July 26, 1963, FM 1170 was extended north to FM 608, replacing FM 2600.

FM 1170 (1949)

The original FM 1170 was designated on March 30, 1949, from SH 24 (now US 380) northward  to a road intersection. On October 28, 1953, FM 1170 was cancelled and mileage was transferred to FM 1385.

FM 1171

FM 1172

Farm to Market Road 1172 (FM 1172) is located in Parmer County.

FM 1172 was designated on April 28, 1955, from FM 690 (now FM 145) at Lazbuddie northward  to a road intersection. On November 21, 1956, FM 1172 was extended northward and eastward . On October 31, 1957, FM 1172 was changed so that it went straight north , and was extended north to SH 86. On June 1, 1965, FM 1172 was extended north to US 60, completing its current route.

FM 1172 (1949)

The original FM 1172 was designated on March 30, 1949, from FM 156 in Justin northeast  to a road intersection. On July 15, 1949, FM 1172 was extended east to US 377. On October 28, 1953, FM 1172 was extended east to FM 1830. On January 6, 1955, FM 1172 was cancelled and mileage was transferred to FM 407.

FM 1173

Farm to Market Road 1173 (FM 1173) is located in Denton County.

FM 1173 begins at an intersection with FM 455 between Slidell and Bolivar. The highway travels in a southern direction mainly through farm land before turning east at Donald Road. FM 1173 travels in an eastern direction and turns southeast at Palmview Road and travels near a few subdivisions before entering Krum, intersecting with FM 156. The highway turns back east at Evans Avenue and passes near a large subdivision before entering Denton and ending at an intersection with the southbound frontage road of I-35.

FM 1173 was designated on March 30, 1949, running from FM 156 at Krum northwestward to a county road at distance of  along a former routing of FM 156. The county road became part of FM 425 on May 23, 1951, which in turn became part of FM 455 on June 25, 1952. FM 1173 was extended  eastward from FM 156 to US 77 on October 26, 1954.

Junction list

RM 1174

Ranch to Market Road 1174 (RM 1174) is located in Burnet County.

On October 1, 1956, FM 1174 was changed to RM 1174. On October 31, 1957, RM 1174 was extended south to RM 1869. On May 7, 1974, RM 1174 was extended southward . On November 25, 1975, RM 1174 was extended southward  to RM 1431, its current terminus.

FM 1174 (1949)

The highway was extended  westward to FM 300 near Sundown on May 23, 1951. FM 1174 was cancelled on February 24, 1953, with the mileage being transferred to FM 41.

FM 1175

FM 1175 (1949)

The original FM 1175 was designated on March 30, 1949, running from US 84 in Anton eastward to the Hockley/Lubbock County line. On December 17, 1952, the road extended west to SH 51 (now US 385). FM 1175 was cancelled on November 1, 1954, and mileage was transferred to FM 597.

FM 1175 (1954)

FM 1175 was cancelled on October 15, 1955, and mileage was transferred to FM 145.

FM 1175 (1957)

The third use of the FM 1175 designation was in Reeves County, from SH 17 at Saragosa to a point . FM 1175 was cancelled on January 29, 1959, in exchange for creating FM 2448.

FM 1176

FM 1177

Farm to Market Road 1177 (FM 1177) is located in northern Wichita and Clay counties. The route lies just south of the Red River and the Oklahoma state line.

FM 1177 was designated on May 26, 1949, along its current route.

FM 1178

FM 1178 (1949)

The original FM 1178 was designated on May 25, 1949, from US 81 at Troy eastward  to the Bell/Falls County Line at Belfalls. FM 1178 was cancelled on September 2, 1955, and mileage was transferred to FM 935.

FM 1179

It is known as Villa Maria Road from SH 47 to the Villa Maria-Briarcrest split, and as Briarcrest Drive from the split to FM 158.

FM 1179 was designated on May 26, 1949, from FM 158 northeast  to Steep Hollow Community. On November 20, 1951, FM 1179 was extended northeast  to Reliance Church. On September 27, 1960, FM 1179 was extended northeast to FM 2038. On November 17, 1977, FM 1179 was extended to SH 6. On December 14, 1989, FM 1179 was extended to then-proposed SH 47. On October 28, 1992, FM 1179 was extended to FM 60. On June 27, 1995, the section from FM 158 to FM 60 was redesignated Urban Road 1179 (UR 1179). On October 26, 1995, the section from SH 47 to FM 60 was removed from the state highway system. The remainder of the section that had been redesignated UR 1179 reverted to FM 1179 with the elimination of the Urban Road system on November 15, 2018.

Junction list

FM 1180

FM 1181

Farm to Market Road 1181 (FM 1181) is located in Ellis County.

FM 1181 begins at an intersection with BL I-45 / SH 34 in Ennis. The highway travels along Creechville Road and has a junction with Interstate 45 before leaving the town. FM 1181 travels through farming areas of the county, connecting them to Ennis. The highway curves several times over the course of its route and travels through Creechville and Telico before ending at an intersection with SH 34 east of Ennis.

FM 1181 was extended  along a new route to a county road on March 26, 1953. The highway was extended  to SH 34 on October 25, 1955, running east of the old FM 1181.

Junction list

FM 1182

Farm to Market Road 1182 (FM 1182) is located in Ellis County.

FM 1182 begins at I-45/US 287 between Alma and Rice. The highway travels in a predominately northeast direction and turns north at Gentry Road. FM 1182 continues to travel in a more northern direction before ending at an intersection with FM 85.

FM 1182 was designated on June 8, 1949, along the current route.

FM 1183

Farm to Market Road 1183 (FM 1183) is located in Ellis County.

FM 1183 begins at I-45/US 287 in Alma. The highway travels in a southwest direction through the town and turns northwest at Oak Grove Road in Ennis. FM 1183 travels through farm land and enters the main part of town after an intersection with US 287. The highway travels along Oak Grove Road in Ennis before traveling along SW Main Street at SH 34. FM 1183 ends at an intersection with Bus. US 287 near the town square.

It was designated on June 8, 1949, on its current route, but it continued 3 blocks east via current Business US 287. On June 18, 1996, the redundant three-block section was removed.

Junction list

FM 1184

FM 1185

FM 1185 (1949)

The original FM 1185 was designated on August 25, 1949, from US 82 in Blossom northward to FM 195 in Faught. FM 1185 was cancelled on January 16, 1953, and mileage was transferred to FM 196.

FM 1186

FM 1187

FM 1188

FM 1189

FM 1190

Farm to Market Road 1190 (FM 1190) is located in Denton County near Lake Ray Roberts.

FM 1190 begins at an intersection with FM 455 in eastern Sanger. The highway travels in a northeastern direction and intersects with FM 2164 before ending at the Sanger Access Point Boat Ramp.

The current FM 1190 was designated on February 3, 1987, along the current route. The highway was created when FM 455 was re-routed due to the construction of Lake Ray Roberts.

Junction list

FM 1190 (1949)

The highway was cancelled on December 20, 1984, with the mileage being transferred to FM 167.

FM 1191

FM 1192

Farm to Market Road 1192 (FM 1192) is located in Denton County, running from Ray Roberts Lake State Park - Jordan Unit to US 377/FM 455 in Pilot Point.

The current FM 1192 was designated on February 3, 1987, along the current route. The highway was created when FM 455 was re-routed due to the construction of Lake Ray Roberts.

Junction list

FM 1192 (1949)

FM 1192 was extended  to FM 1190 near Acton on November 26, 1969, absorbing FM 3026. The highway was cancelled on December 20, 1984, with the mileage being transferred to FM 208. FM 208 was transferred to FM 4 on February 25, 1985.

FM 1193

Farm to Market Road 1193 (FM 1193) is located in Collin County in the town of Prosper.

FM 1193 begins at an intersection with Coleman Street (business SH 289 before August 30, 2018) near the town square. The highway travels east along Broadway Street before ending at an intersection with SH 289 (Preston Road).

The current FM 1193 was designated on May 6, 1964, along the current route.

FM 1193 (1949)

The highway was cancelled on February 6, 1953, with the mileage being transferred to FM 4.

FM 1193 (1953)

The highway was extended  to FM 1082 on September 29, 1954. The highway was cancelled on October 22, 1962, with the mileage being transferred to FM 600.

FM 1194

FM 1194 (1949)

The original FM 1194 was designated on July 14, 1949, From SH 254 west of Graford southward  to a road intersection. FM 1194 was cancelled on October 7, 1955, and mileage was transferred to FM 4.

FM 1194 (1957)

The second FM 1194 was designated on October 31, 1957, from US 277 in Tennyson eastward  to the Coke/Runnels County Line. FM 1194 was cancelled on December 5, 1958, and mileage was transferred to FM 2333.

FM 1195

Farm to Market Road 1195 (FM 1195) is located in Palo Pinto County. It runs from US 180 east of Mineral Wells south and west to US 281.

FM 1195 was designated on July 14, 1949, from US 180 east of Mineral Wells southeastward  to a county road (current FM 3028). The old route of FM 1195 was originally planned to be removed from the state highway system upon completion of the new route, but the old route was kept in the state highway system as FM 1821 on January 25, 1959, but this did not take effect until construction on the new route was completed. On May 6, 1964, the road extended west to US 281, completing its current route.

FM 1196

FM 1196 (1949)

FM 1196 was cancelled on October 9, 1951, and mileage was transferred to FM 374, which became part of FM 210 on December 10, 1953 (FM 374 has since been reassigned to another highway).

FM 1197

Farm to Market Road 1197 (FM 1197) is located in Clay County.

The southern terminus of FM 1197 is at  US 82 in downtown Henrietta, and the route travels north along North Bridge Street through the city, passing the rodeo grounds, city square, the Clay County Courthouse, and Henrietta Reservoir. After leaving Henrietta, the two-lane, shoulderless route crosses the Little Wichita River and passes through the farming areas of northern Clay County before ending at an intersection with  FM 2332 northeast of Hurnville.

FM 1197 was first designated on July 14, 1949. The southern terminus was relocated to US 82 within the city of Henrietta on December 18, 1950, making FM 1197 a true north–south route. On November 21, 1956, FM 1197 was extended south to US 82, so that the route designation was such that it formed a complete loop with US 82, with its "northern" terminus, now at US 82; however, this extension was canceled October 31, 1957, with part of the extension being cancelled and the rest of the extension, not connecting to the end of FM 1197 before the extension, being renumbered FM 2535. On October 13, 1960, the route designation was truncated its current terminus at FM 2332, with the remainder of the route, as well as FM 2535, becoming part of that route.

Junction list

FM 1198

Farm to Market Road 1198 (FM 1198) is located in Cooke County. It runs from US 82 south to FM 922.

FM 1198 was designated on July 14, 1949, from US 82 to Myra. On May 2, 1962, the designation was extended south to FM 1630. On November 26, 1969, FM 1198 was extended south to its current terminus at FM 922.

FM 1199

Farm to Market Road 1199 (FM 1199) is located in Cooke County.

FM 1199 was designated on July 14, 1949, from US 82 west of Lindsay through Lindsay to US 82 east of Lindsay. On May 7, 1974, FM 1199 was extended northward and westward  to a county road. On May 25, 1976, FM 1199 was extended west and north  to a county road northwest of Lindsay.

Notes

References

+11
Farm to market roads 1100
Farm to Market Roads 1100